HMS Dorsetshire was a 70-gun third-rate ship of the line of the Royal Navy, built at Chatham Dockyard to the draught specified by the 1745 Establishment, amended in 1754, and launched on 13 December 1757.

At the action of 29 April 1758, Dorsetshire defeated and captured French ship of the line  in the Bay of Biscay.

Dorsetshire served until 1775, when she was broken up.

Notes

References

 Lavery, Brian (2003) The Ship of the Line – Volume 1: The development of the battlefleet 1650–1850. Conway Maritime Press. .

External links
 

Ships of the line of the Royal Navy
1757 ships